Spring in Winter is a 1917 Hungarian film directed by Michael Curtiz.

Cast
 Sándor Góth
 Erzsi B. Marton
 Ica von Lenkeffy
 Zoltán Szerémy
 Lajos Kemenes
 Charles Puffy
 Rózsi Szöllösi
 Rene Sello
 Karoly Gardai

See also
 Michael Curtiz filmography

References

External links

Films directed by Michael Curtiz
1917 films
Hungarian black-and-white films
Hungarian silent films
Austro-Hungarian films